White Township is an inactive township in Macon County, in the U.S. state of Missouri.

White Township has the name of Randolph White, a pioneer settler.

References

Townships in Missouri
Townships in Macon County, Missouri